Helen TeAta Gale Cole (July 13, 1922 – April 7, 2004) was an American politician who served in the Oklahoma House of Representatives from 1979 to 1984, when she was first elected to the Oklahoma Senate. Cole returned to the state senate in 1991 and was succeeded by Kathleen Wilcoxson in 1997.

Her son, Tom Cole, is the longest-serving Native American in the history of the United States Congress.

Early life and education 
Helen TeAta Gale was born in Tishomingo, Oklahoma, on July 13, 1922, to William Oakley Gale and Avis Minnette Fifield (Thompson). She was raised in a single-parent household and graduated from Ardmore High School in 1939.

Career 
Cole was active in several local civic and political organizations, and contributed to the successful gubernatorial campaigns of Henry Bellmon and Dewey Bartlett. Cole was named a delegate to the 1968 Republican National Convention, and Bartlett appointed her to the Oklahoma Personnel Board. Cole then ran for a seat on the Oklahoma House of Representatives. From 1979 to 1984, she represented district 54.

Cole contested the 45th district Oklahoma Senate seat in 1984, and won one term. Cole retired, only to return to her political career as mayor of Moore, Oklahoma, in 1990. The next year, she succeeded her son Tom Cole as state senator from the 45th district. Cole was named a National Convention delegate for a second time for the 1992 Republican National Convention. Cole stepped down from the state senate in 1997, and was succeeded by Kathleen Wilcoxson. Cole was then appointed a National Convention delegate for a third time for the 2000 Republican National Convention. In retirement, she became a benefactor of the University of Science and Arts of Oklahoma.

Personal life 
Cole was of Chickasaw and Choctaw descent. She was a member of the Chickasaw Nation.

References

1922 births
2004 deaths
20th-century American politicians
20th-century American women politicians
21st-century Native Americans
20th-century Native American politicians
20th-century Native American women
21st-century Native American women
Chickasaw people of Choctaw descent
20th-century Members of the Oklahoma House of Representatives
Chickasaw Nation state legislators in Oklahoma
Native American women in politics
Republican Party Oklahoma state senators
People from Moore, Oklahoma
People from Tishomingo, Oklahoma
Women mayors of places in Oklahoma
Women state legislators in Oklahoma
Republican Party members of the Oklahoma House of Representatives